Helena Rivière (born 17 August 1940 in Karlskoga) is a Swedish Moderate Party politician. She was a member of the Riksdag from 2006 to 2010.

External links
Helena Rivière at the Riksdag website

Members of the Riksdag from the Moderate Party
Members of the Riksdag 2006–2010
Living people
1940 births
Women members of the Riksdag
People from Karlskoga Municipality
21st-century Swedish women politicians